is a railway station  on the Hitahikosan Line in Soeda, Fukuoka, Japan, operated by Kyushu Railway Company (JR Kyushu). Hikosan is the last station for southbound trains before entering the 4380 m Shakadake Tunnel between here and Chikuzen Iwaya Station, which involved a fatal collapse during construction in 1953, claiming the lives of 21 construction workers.

Lines
Hikosan Station is served by the Hitahikosan Line.

Adjacent stations

See also
 List of railway stations in Japan

References

External links

  

Railway stations in Fukuoka Prefecture
Railway stations in Japan opened in 1942